Pake may refer to:
 Password-authenticated key exchange (PAKE)
 Pākē, Hawaiian language term for Chinese in Hawaii
 Pake, California
 Páké, alternative name of Brateș
 Ralph Pake
 George Pake
 Pake McEntire
 Pake doublet

See also